The Truth About Beauty is a 2014 Chinese-Hong Kong romantic comedy film directed by Aubrey Lam and starring Bai Baihe, Ronald Cheng, Zhang Yao and Guo Jingfei.

Cast
 Bai Baihe
 Ronald Cheng
 Zhang Yao
 Guo Jingfei

Reception
The film has earned  US$13,380,000 in China.

On Film Business Asia, Derek Elley gave the film a grade of 7 out of 10, calling it a "scabrous satire on success and cosmetic surgery".

References

External links
 

2014 romantic comedy films
2014 films
Chinese romantic comedy films
2010s Mandarin-language films
Hong Kong romantic comedy films
2010s Hong Kong films